Clayton Equipment Company Ltd, now known simply as Clayton Equipment Ltd or CEC and  CEL, is a locomotive construction company that specialises in rail equipment, design and build, tunnelling, mining, metro, mainline and shunter locomotives.

Inception

Clayton Equipment Ltd was preceded by Clayton Wagons Ltd., a subsidiary company of Clayton & Shuttleworth based in Lincoln, England.  As well as railway rolling stock, Clayton Wagons also constructed motive power such as steam-powered railcars, including one of only two steam railcars to operate in New Zealand.

In February 1930, Clayton Wagons Ltd. went into receivership and its Chief Draughtsman incorporated the Clayton Equipment Company Ltd in 1931 to continue supplying spare parts and maintenance for Clayton's products. Founded in 1931 by Stanley Reid Devlin with an authorised share capital of £1000 shares of £1 each. These shares were all owned by Devlin and his wife who formed the company and were sole Directors. The Clayton Equipment Company Ltd, as it was known then, began life as a single person operating manufacturing goods and spares parts for Clayton carriage and Wagon equipment.

Growth, acquisition, and independence

After World War II, Clayton Equipment Ltd experienced significant growth as it acted as a subcontractor of International Combustion, constructing various products such as farming equipment and industrial conveyors in response to a post-War shortage. The expansion necessitated the acquisition of new premises Record Works in Hatton, Derbyshire, and in 1957, Clayton Equipment was acquired by International Combustion Ltd. The site in Hatton had produced battery and Diesel powered generator sets for the Post Office, Flax Drying, a Glass Works and a stores for military equipment.

One of the first orders obtained was for 13 flame proof   battery locomotives for the Polish coalmines through a Polish company called Centrazap.

British Rail, as part of its dieselisation scheme, contracted Clayton Equipment Ltd to supply eighty-eight diesel-electric locomotives (what would later be known as the BR Class 17), and other orders were fulfilled for international customers from nations as diverse as Australia, Korea, Cuba and Poland. A £5 million contract by British Railways for 88 mainline diesel electric locomotives followed during the same year, supplemented by 1.75 million order for ten  models that were exported to Cuba was obtained whilst, at the time, the company sales, particularly of mining and tunnelling locomotives, which were primarily for the export market, also continued to rise. The Cuban locomotives were based on the Brush Type 4 locomotives also been built at the same time. In 1962, a decision was made by the National Coal Board (NCB) that all pit ponies were to be removed from mines in the United Kingdom. The NCB expressed an interest in using small locomotives to help remove material from their pits. Clayton Equipment supplied a number of these machines which were put into service, before being asked to develop a locomotive that could negotiate steeper gradients. Clayton Equipment designed and manufactured a special rubber-tyred locomotive of especially small size to work in mines, and this became one of its most popular products.  It was mainly supplied to British mines, but as the British mining industry went into sharp decline, Clayton was required to promote its product heavily to international customers to retain a sustainable level of business. A major marketing drive to expand into overseas territories and diversification into the tunnelling and construction sectors was essential. This provided to be a huge success, and today over 90% of equipment is produced for the export market.

Mr S R Devlin retired from the company in 1965. After a number of changes of ownership at higher levels, during which time Clayton Equipment Ltd established itself as a market leader in underground rail haulage solutions. International Combustion was acquired by Clarke Chapman Ltd of Gateshead in 1974 and in 1979 the organisation merged with Reyrolle Parsons of Newcastle, manufacturer of large steam turbines for power stations, etc., to form a new company called Northern Engineering Industries which at one stage employed in the region of 35,000 people. Ten years later, Northern Engineering Industries (NEI) was acquired by Rolls-Royce as part of a strategy to diversify its product line into industrial power, and Clayton Equipment became a part of the Rolls-Royce Industrial Power Group in 1989.  In 1994 Rolls-Royce divested itself of the remaining companies within the Northern Engineering Industries Mining Equipment Group, retaining only Clayton Equipment. Consequently, the company was put under the control of Rolls-Royce Materials Handling based at Gateshead and then later Rolls-Royce Industrial Businesses in Derby. It nonetheless retained a significant measure of autonomy, and in March 2005, it became an independent company again.

Clayton Equipment Ltd today

Much of the company's orders now come from overseas, from countries such as Ireland and Russia. The company's main products are locomotives for Shunting, mainline railways, tunnelling, and underground mining. Power sources include battery-electric, battery hybrid and Diesel. It also provides a special design and build service; tunnel drilling machines, cable handlers, overhauling or upgrading existing equipment, converting from old Diesel to clean battery locomotives and training services.

Four new 75 hp battery powered locomotives named Walter, Lou, Anne and Kitty were built by Clayton Equipment in Derby to haul materials and plant along the line during the closure of the Waterloo & City line. These have since been reused on the East London Line.

Clayton Equipment remain the only UK locomotive manufacturer that can design locomotives from 2 tonne to 135 tonne.
Recent advances include the world's first EU Stage IV Diesel locomotives for use on 100 km Crossrail project, used to run trains for the installation of track, cable management systems, cross passage doors, ventilation, walkways, drainage, fire mains and lighting (Elizabeth Line in London). The world's longest construction train for use on the ElecLink project in the Channel Tunnel, to simultaneously drill 144 holes into the concrete tunnel lining, and to lift and place 24 steel beams onto the tunnel wall. Over 500 meters long, travelling speed of 90 km/h and extend outside of gauge when in working mode. Drilled over 32,000 holes, lift and place over 8,000 30 kg support brackets, lift and place over 8,000 350 kg steel beams, emission free, 1,740 kWh, on-board battery power supply, mass of over 528 tonnes and HEPA filtered clean rooms, with controlled temperature 20 °C and humidity (<50Rh).

Conversion of ten maintenance Diesel locomotives to zero emission battery locomotives, complete with on-board charging for London Underground. Operating from both the on-board traction battery and the 3rd/4th rail supply retaining the existing chassis, cab, brakes and axles to reduce compliance issues. Retaining the existing driver controls to keep driver familiarity and reduce training demands with sufficient battery power to undertake 1 day's full duty cycle. Hauling up to 240 tonnes up and down a 1:30 gradient, and travel up to 49 km/h, increasing the mass from 34 to 40 tonnes.

The UK's largest locomotives built in the UK since 2003 (a fleet of 90 tonne, battery hybrid Bo-Bo locomotives for Tata Steel, Port Talbot) Power is delivered by the traction battery and 416 kW maintenance free, high torque electric motors. The locomotive is self-contained, with on-board battery charging from a low emission, EU Stage V compliant Diesel engine. The locomotive design offers high torque, high haulage capability with over 300 kN tractive effort, delivering the 2,500 tonne loads safely across the Port Talbot works, operating on their maximum gradient of 1;60 (1.7%).

The supply of two Clayton battery-diesel 80 tonne locomotives will enable Sellafield Ltd to realise significant commercial benefits from reduced operation and maintenance costs. Additional benefits from their investment in greener technology include reduced emissions from the cleanest diesel engines, a reduced carbon footprint, reduced noise levels, greater haulage capacity and increased reliability.

An agreed contract with Beacon Rail Leasing for the supply of 15 innovative Clayton battery-diesel 90 tonne locomotives along with options for a period of three years.

See also 
British Rail DHP1
British Rail Class 17
British Rail Class 18

References

External links
Official website of Clayton Equipment Ltd

Locomotive manufacturers of the United Kingdom
Engineering companies of the United Kingdom
Clayton locomotives